Cahíta is a group of Indigenous peoples of Mexico, which includes the Yaqui and Mayo people. Numbering approximately 40,000, they live in west coast of the states of Sonora and Sinaloa.

Language

Their languages, the Yaqui and Mayo languages, form the Cáhitan branch of the Uto-Aztecan language family. They are agglutinative languages, where words use suffix complexes for a variety of purposes, with several morphemes strung together. The Cáhita population was drastically reduced by Spanish explorers around the 19th century.

References

Agglutinative languages
 
Ethnic groups in Mexico
Indigenous peoples in Mexico